Hermine Reuss of Greiz (17 December 1887 – 7 August 1947) was the second wife of Wilhelm II. They were married in 1922, four years after he abdicated as German Emperor and King of Prussia. He was her second husband; her first husband, Prince Johann of Schönaich-Carolath, had died in 1920.

Early life

Princess Hermine was born in Greiz as the fifth child and fourth daughter of Heinrich XXII, Prince Reuss of Greiz (28 March 1846 – 19 April 1902), and Princess Ida Mathilde Adelheid of Schaumburg-Lippe (28 July 1852 – 28 September 1891), daughter of Adolf I, Prince of Schaumburg-Lippe. Her father was the ruler of the Principality of Reuss-Greiz, a state of the German Empire, in what is present-day Thuringia. Princess Hermine's disabled elder brother became Heinrich XXIV, Prince Reuss of Greiz in 1902.

First marriage
Princess Hermine was married on 7 January 1907 in Greiz to Prince Johann George Ludwig Ferdinand August of Schönaich-Carolath (11 September 1873 – 7 April 1920).

They were the parents of five children:
 Prince Hans Georg Heinrich Ludwig Friedrich Hermann Ferdinand of Schönaich-Carolath (3 November 1907 – 9 August 1943), married Baroness Sibylle von Zedlitz und Leipe, killed in action at the Eastern Front during the Second World War.
 Prince Georg Wilhelm of Schönaich-Carolath (16 March 1909 – 1 November 1927), died unmarried.
 Princess Hermine Caroline Wanda Ida Luise Feodora Viktoria Auguste of Schönaich-Carolath (9 May 1910 – 30 May 1959), married Hugo Herbert Hartung.
 Prince Ferdinand Johann Georg Hermann Heinrich Ludwig Wilhelm Friedrich August of Schönaich-Carolath (5 April 1913 – 17 October 1973), married Rose Rauch (1912-1987), then Baroness Margarethe von Seckendorff (1908-1991).
 Princess Henriette Hermine Wanda Ida Luise of Schönaich-Carolath (25 November 1918 – 16 March 1972), married Wilhelm II's grandson Prince Karl Franz of Prussia (son of Prince Joachim of Prussia) in 1940 and had issue.

Marriage to ex-Emperor Wilhelm II

In January 1922, a son of Princess Hermine sent birthday wishes to the exiled German Emperor Wilhelm II, who then invited the boy and his mother to Huis Doorn. Wilhelm found Hermine very attractive, and greatly enjoyed her company. The two had much in common, both being recently widowed: Hermine just over a year and a half before and Wilhelm only nine months prior.

By early 1922, Wilhelm was determined to marry Hermine. Despite grumblings from Wilhelm's monarchist supporters and the objections of his children, 63-year-old Wilhelm and 34-year-old Hermine married on 5 November 1922 in Doorn. Wilhelm's physician, Alfred Haehner, suspected that Hermine had married the former kaiser only in the belief that she would become an empress and that she had become increasingly bitter as it became apparent that would not be the case. Shortly before the couple's first wedding anniversary, Haehner recorded how Hermine had told him how "inconsiderately [Wilhelm] behaved towards her" and how Wilhelm's face showed "a strong dislike" for his wife. Hermine's first husband had also been older than she was, by fourteen years. Wilhelm and Hermine were fourth cousins once removed through mutual descent from Louis IX, Landgrave of Hesse-Darmstadt and fifth cousins through common descent from King George II of Great Britain.

In 1927, Hermine wrote An Empress in Exile: My Days in Doorn, an account of her life until then. She cared for the property management of Huis Doorn and by establishing her own relief organization, she stayed in contact with monarchist and nationalist circles in the Weimar Republic. Hermine also shared her husband's anti-Semitism. She remained a constant companion to the aging emperor until his death in 1941. They had no children.

Later life
Following the death of Wilhelm, Hermine returned to Germany to live on her first husband's estate in Saabor, Lower Silesia. During the Vistula–Oder Offensive of early 1945, she fled from the advancing Red Army to her sister's estate in Rossla, Thuringia. After the end of the Second World War, she was held under house arrest at Frankfurt on the Oder, in the Soviet occupation zone, and later imprisoned in the Paulinenhof Internment Camp. On 7 August 1947, aged 59, she died suddenly of a heart attack in a small flat in Frankfurt, while under guard by the Red Army occupation forces. She was buried in the Antique Temple of Sanssouci Park, Potsdam, in what would become East Germany. Some years earlier, it was the resting place of several other members of the Imperial family, including Wilhelm's first wife, Augusta Victoria of Schleswig-Holstein.

Dramatic representation
In 2017, Janet McTeer played a fictional Princess Hermine in The Exception alongside Christopher Plummer as Kaiser Wilhelm II.

Ancestry

References

External links

 

|-

|-

1887 births
1947 deaths
House of Schönaich-Carolath
House of Hohenzollern
Princesses of Reuss
Wilhelm II, German Emperor
German monarchists
People from Greiz
People from Doorn
Daughters of monarchs